Emrah Erdoğan İpek (born January 1, 1971) is a Turkish singer, actor and child star during 1980's.

Life and Career 
He was born in Diyarbakır and is of Kurdish descent. he professionally entered the music world with his album Ağam Ağam during his time in middle school during 1984. With his performance in the leading role of the movie Zavallılar (1984), he became known as "Küçük Emrah" (Little Emrah). The next year, he released his second album Gülom and Yaralı, which gained success. His subsequent follow-ups, Boynu Bükükler (1986) and Ayrılamam (1987) became best sellers. Emrah has sold more than 25 million records in Turkey.

In 2014, he married Sibel Kirer, with whom he has a son and a daughter. He also has a son from a previous relationship.

Discography

Albums
(1983) Ağam Ağam
(1984) Gülom
(1985) Yaralı
(1986) Boynu Bükükler
(1987) Ayrılamam
(1988) Selam Sevdiklerime
(1988) Neşeliyim
(1989) Sevdim
(1990) Hoşgeldin Gülüm]
(1991) Sen Gülünce
(1992) Bahar Konseri
(1993) Haydi Şimdi
(1994) Sevdim Mi Tam Severim
(1995) Klasikleri
(1996) Narin Yarim
(1997) Nostalji
(1998) Dura Dura
(2000) Ya Hey
(2002) Ar+ı
(2003) Türküler ve Emrah
(2004) Kusursuzsun
(2005) Dön
(2006) Adın Ne Senin
(2007) Best of Emrah
(2008) Yelpaze
(2011) Terzinin Oğlu

Singles
(2013) "Kasırga" (Gelmeyen Bahar movie soundtrack)
(2017) "Kırmızı Gül Demet Demet"
(2017) "Eledim Eledim"
(2019) "Gerçek Şu Ki" (feat. Ozan Doğulu)
(2020) "Salgın"
(2022) "Ayakta Kal Yüreğim"
(2022) "Kızım"
(2022) "Kahpe Felek" (feat. Caner Tepecik)

Filmography

Movies
 1984 – Zavallılar
 1984 – Yaralı
 1985 – Acıların Çocuğu
 1986 – Ökzüzler
 1986 – Acı Lokma
 1986 – Merhamet
 1986 – Ayrılamam
 1987 – Sefiller
 1987 – Vurmayın
 1988 – Es Deli Rüzgâr
 1988 – Acı
 1988 – Seninle Ilk Defa
 1989 – Sevdim
 1990 – Can Evimden Vurdular
 1990 – Yalnız Güneş Şahitti
 1991 – Hoşgeldin Gülüm
 1991 – Ibret
 1991 – Ölesiye Sevmek
 1993 – Yasak Sokaklar
 1993 – Sensiz Olmaz
 1994 – Yalnız Güneş Şahitti
 2013 – Gelmeyen Bahar (writer-director-composer)

Television series
 1992 – Gündüzün Karanlığı
 1997 – Unutabilsem as Emrah
 1999 – Belalım Benim
 2002-2004 – Kınalı Kar as Ali
 2004-2006 – Büyük Yalan as Emirhan
 2006 – Adak as Cem
 2007 – Oğlum için as Kemal
 2009 – Hicran Yarası as Aziz
 2016–2018 – Aşk ve Mavi as Ali

References

External links
 Official web site of Emrah

Living people
1971 births
People from Ergani
Turkish male child actors
Turkish child singers
Turkish male television actors
Turkish male film actors
21st-century Turkish singers
21st-century Turkish male singers